Marko Vukčević (Montenegrin Cyrillic: Марко Вукчевић; born 7 June 1993) is a Montenegrin professional footballer who plays for Romanian Liga I side UTA Arad.

Club career

Budućnost
Vukčević started his professional career at his hometown club Budućnost Podgorica. He provided an assist to teammate Mitar Peković in the 2013 Montenegrin Cup Final against Čelik Nikšić, which Budućnost won 1–0. By the end of his first spell at Budućnost, he played a total of 52 league matches and scored 8 goals.

Olimpija Ljubljana
On 23 August 2013, Vukčević transferred to the Slovenian club Olimpija. He made his debut for Olimpija on 31 August 2013 in a match against Domžale, where his side lost 3–0. On 9 November 2013, he scored his first goal for Olimpija in a league match against Domžale. In September 2015, Olimpija sent Vukčević on a season loan to Serbian side FK Vojvodina. Over the course of the 2015-16 season at Vojvodina, he played a total of 20 games and recorded one goal and three assists by the time his loan deal to Vojvodina expired in June 2016.

Return to Budućnost
On 27 July 2017, Vukčević signed a one-year contract with Budućnost.

Inter Zaprešić
On 11 January 2018, Vukčević signed with Croatian club Inter Zaprešić.

International career
Vukčević has appeared for Montenegro's youth selections up to the under-21 level. He has been a frequently relied-on player for Montenegro U21 for the 2015 UEFA European Under-21 Football Championship qualification. He made his senior debut for Montenegro in a June 2015 friendly match against Denmark and has, as of 19 October 2020, earned a total of 3 caps, scoring no goals.

International stats

International goals
Scores and results list Montenegro's goal tally first, score column indicates score after each Vukčević goal.

Honours
Budućnost Podgorica
 Prva CFL: 2011–12
 Montenegrin Cup: 2012–13

Olimpija Ljubljana
 Slovenian Cup runner-up: 2016–17

References

External links

PrvaLiga profile 

1993 births
Living people
Footballers from Podgorica
Association football wingers
Montenegrin footballers
Montenegro youth international footballers
Montenegro under-21 international footballers
Montenegro international footballers
FK Budućnost Podgorica players
NK Olimpija Ljubljana (2005) players
FK Vojvodina players
NK Inter Zaprešić players
Paykan F.C. players
OFK Grbalj players
FK Podgorica players
FC UTA Arad players
Montenegrin First League players
Slovenian PrvaLiga players
Serbian SuperLiga players
Croatian Football League players
Persian Gulf Pro League players
Liga I players
Montenegrin expatriate footballers
Expatriate footballers in Slovenia
Montenegrin expatriate sportspeople in Slovenia
Expatriate footballers in Serbia
Montenegrin expatriate sportspeople in Serbia
Expatriate footballers in Croatia
Montenegrin expatriate sportspeople in Croatia
Expatriate footballers in Iran
Montenegrin expatriate sportspeople in Iran
Expatriate footballers in Romania
Montenegrin expatriate sportspeople in Romania